Death at the Opera is a 1934 mystery detective novel by the British writer Gladys Mitchell. It was the fifth novel in her series featuring the psychoanalyst and amateur detective Mrs Bradley. It was published in the United States under the alternative title of  Death in the Wet.

In 2000 it was adapted for an episode of the television series The Mrs Bradley Mysteries starring Diana Rigg.

It was favorably reviewed by the Mysteries Ahoy blog.

Synopsis
An English boarding school stages a production of The Mikado. When one of the teachers, given a starring role in the production, is found dead on the opening night Mrs Bradley is called in to investigate.

References

Bibliography
 Miskimmin, Esme. 100 British Crime Writers. Springer Nature, 2020.
 Reilly, John M. Twentieth Century Crime & Mystery Writers. Springer, 2015.
 Stewart, Victoria. Crime Writing in Interwar Britain: Fact and Fiction in the Golden Age. Cambridge University Press, 2017.

1934 British novels
Novels by Gladys Mitchell
British crime novels
British mystery novels
Novels set in England
British detective novels
British novels adapted into television shows